The 2015–16 UAB Blazers basketball team represented the University of Alabama at Birmingham during the 2015–16 NCAA Division I men's basketball season. The Blazers, led by fourth year head coach Jerod Haase, played their home games at the Bartow Arena as members of Conference USA. They finished the season 26–7, 16–2 in C-USA play to win the C-USA regular season championship. They lost in the quarterfinals of the C-USA tournament to WKU. As a regular season conference champion who failed to win their conference tournament, they received an automatic bid to the National Invitation Tournament where they lost in the first round to BYU.

Following the season, head coach Jerod Haase left UAB to accept the head coaching position at Stanford. On April 4, 2016, the school hired Robert Ehsan, who had been an assistant under Haase at UAB, as head coach .

Previous season
The Blazers finished the 2014–15 season 20–16, 12–6 in C-USA play to finish in a tie for fourth place. They defeated WKU, Louisiana Tech, and Middle Tennessee to become champions of the C-USA tournament. They received the conference's automatic bid to the NCAA tournament as a No. 14 seed where they upset No. 3-seeded and No. 9-ranked Iowa State in the Second round before losing in the Third round to No. 11-seeded UCLA.

Departures

Incoming transfers

Incoming recruits

Roster

Schedule

|-
!colspan=9 style=|Exhibition

|-
!colspan=9 style=|Non-conference regular season

|-
!colspan=12 style=| Conference USA regular season

|-
!colspan=9 style=| Conference USA tournament

|-
!colspan=9 style=| NIT

References

UAB Blazers men's basketball seasons
UAB
UAB Blazers men's basketball
UAB Blazers men's basketball
UAB